David Charles Geoffrey Foster (born 19 September 1959) is an English former first-class cricketer.

Foster was born at Holbeach, Lincolnshire. He was educated at Sutton Valence School, before going up to Christ Church, Oxford. While studying at Oxford, he played first-class cricket for Oxford University in 1980, making four appearances. He scored 124 runs in his four matches, at an average of 24.60 and a high score of 67. After graduating from Oxford he became a solicitor, being admitted in November 1984.

References

External links

1959 births
Living people
People from Holbeach
People educated at Sutton Valence School
Alumni of Christ Church, Oxford
English cricketers
Oxford University cricketers
English solicitors